Ernesto Herrera may refer to:

Ernesto Herrera (politician) (1942–2015), Senator of the Philippines
Ernesto Herrera (playwright) (1889–1917), Uruguayan writer
Ernesto Herrera Tovar (born 1972), Mexican politician

See also
 Abel Ernesto Herrera (born 1955), Argentine footballer